NGC 2129 is an open cluster in the constellation Gemini.  It has an angular distance of 2.5 arcminutes and is approximately 2.2 ± 0.2 kpc (~7,200 light years) from the Sun inside the Local spiral arm.  At that distance, the angular size of the cluster corresponds to a diameter of about 10.4 light years. NGC 2129 is a very young cluster whose age has been estimated at 10 million years.

The group is dominated by two close B-Type stars, HD 250289 (B2III) and HD 250290 (B3I).  With the two stars sharing the same proper motion and radial velocity it is likely that the two constitute a binary system.

See also
List of Messier objects
List of NGC objects
List of open clusters
General Catalogue of Nebulae and Clusters

References

External links
 
 NASA/IPAC Extragalactic Database (NED): NGC 2129
 

Open clusters
Gemini (constellation)
2129